There are two distinct arrondissements in France which are called Arrondissement of Saint-Denis:
Arrondissement of Saint-Denis in the Seine-Saint-Denis département
Arrondissement of Saint-Denis in the Réunion département